Driftin' Thru is a 1926 American silent Western film starring Harry Carey.

Plot
As described in a film magazine review, Daniel Brown, a drifter, attempts to go to the aid of Stella, the wife of gambling den's owner Bull Dunn, finds himself framed with a murder charge when the wife shoots a gambler. Dan makes his escape with his donkey named Kentuck and boards a train where he is aided by a young woman who hides him in a Pullman stateroom. It turns out that the woman owns a ranch. Dan finds refuge with prospector Joshua Reynolds, who tells him that there is gold on the ranch property of the woman. Dan foils the scheme of the ranch foreman and Stella to rob the woman of her real property. The young woman then proves Dan innocent of the murder charge and marries him.

Cast
 Harry Carey as Daniel Brown
 Stanton Heck as Bull Dunn
 Ruth King as Stella Dunn
 G. Raymond Nye as Joe Walters
 Joseph W. Girard as Sheriff (as Joseph Girard)
 Harriet Hammond as The Girl
 Bert Woodruff as Joshua Reynolds

See also
 List of American films of 1926
 Harry Carey filmography

References

External links

 
 

1926 films
American black-and-white films
1926 Western (genre) films
Films directed by Scott R. Dunlap
Pathé Exchange films
Silent American Western (genre) films
1920s American films
1920s English-language films